The State Farm Women's Tennis Classic was a women's tennis tournament held in Scottsdale, Arizona, United States from 2000 to 2003. It was played on outdoor hardcourts and was a Tier II tournament throughout its run. Despite its short time as a WTA tournament, it boasts an impressive list of winners including Serena Williams and Lindsay Davenport.

Past finals

Singles

Doubles

See also
 List of tennis tournaments

References

 
Defunct tennis tournaments in the United States
Hard court tennis tournaments in the United States
WTA Tour
Sports in Scottsdale, Arizona
Recurring sporting events established in 2000
Recurring events disestablished in 2003
Tennis tournaments in Arizona
Sports competitions in Maricopa County, Arizona